Chamling is one of the  Kirati languages spoken by the Chamling (Mansungcha, Lipungchha, Malekungchha, Maidhung, kherasung, Rakhomi, Rodung, etc) of Nepal, India and Bhutan. Alternate renderings and names include Chamling, Chamlinge and Rodong. It is closely related to the Bantawa (some Bantawa-speaking communities call their language "Camling") and Puma languages of the Kiranti language family in eastern Nepal, and it belongs to the broader Sino-Tibetan language family. Chamling has SOV word order.

History
The Chamling language is one of the languages of the ancient Kiranti culture, which existed well before vedic period 3500–5000 in South Asia. Important versions of the Mundhum — the main religious text forming the religious foundation of the Kirant Mundhum religion and the cultural heritage of the various Kirati people — are composed in Camling; such versions are distinctive to the Camling-speaking tribes and a guide to their distinctive religious practices and cultural identity.

Distribution
The Chamling language is used by small communities in eastern Sagarmatha Zone, in central Khotang District, Bhojpur District and scattered areas in northern Udayapur District and a few more districts of eastern Nepal, the southeastern neighbour Indian state of Sikkim, the hill city of Darjeeling, Kalimpong in the Indian state of West Bengal and the kingdom of Bhutan.

Demographics
Despite its geographic prevalence, the actual number of Chamling speakers is estimated to be 10,000, spread across small tribes and villages. Many members of the Chamling ethnic and tribal communities are no longer fluent in the Chamling language, which is taught only in remote areas in the Udayapur District. Like Bantawa, Chamling is an endangered language. Many people in these areas speak a variety of Chamling that is mixed with the Nepali language, which is the official language of Nepal. Most Chamling-speaking people are Hindus or practitioners of Kiranti Mundhum.

Phonology and voice

Consonants

Vowels

Voice

Phuima = pluck
Toma = see, experience
Ityu = brought from above
Dhotyu-cyu' = assembled themBhuima = poundDoma = closeIdyu = gave himDhodyu-cyu = stabbed them

 Bound Morphemes 

Chamling uses many bound morphemes, many of which denote possession or the change of possession of something.

 Phrase Structure Rules 
NP —> (D) N

VP —> (NP) (A) (Adv) V (Adv)

CP —> C S

S —> NP {VP, NP, CP}

examples:

This is 3. an example of a sentence that is formed by an NP and a VP. The NP contains a determiner and a noun, and the VP contains a verb.

This is an example of a sentence that is formed by a NP and a VP. The NP contains a noun and a VP contains a verb and an adverb.

This is an example of two NP's forming a sentence. One NP contains "khamo nung" ("your name") and the second NP contains "de" ("what").''

See also
Languages of Nepal
Languages of Bhutan

References

8.Rai, Tara Mani and Sizar Tamang (2014) A sociolinguistic survey of Chamling: A Tibeto-Burman language.https://cdltu.edu.np

External links
Global Recordings - Camling language recordings

Kiranti languages
Languages of Nepal
Languages of India
Languages of Bhutan
Endangered Sino-Tibetan languages
Languages of Koshi Province